Hazle is a surname. Notable people with this name include:

Bob Hazle (1930–1992), American baseball player
Edmund Hazle (1918–2006), British soldier
George Hazle (1924–2011), South African racewalker
Marlene Hazle (1934–2011), American computer scientist
Mike Hazle (born 1979), American javelin thrower

See also
Hazle Creek
Hazle Township, Luzerne County, Pennsylvania
Hazel (surname)